Damon and Pythias is a legend in Greek historic writings.

Damon and Pythias may also refer to:

 Damon and Pythias (play), a play by Richard Edwards printed in 1571
 Damon and Pythias (1821 play), a 19th century play by John Banim
 Damon and Pythias (1914 film), an American silent epic film directed by Otis Turner
 Damon and Pythias (1962 film), an Italian/American film directed by Curtis Bernhardt